Varanasi Ram Mohan Rao (1939-2005) widely known as Ram Mohan was an Indian actor known for his works primarily in Telugu cinema, and few Tamil films. He is featured in more than 25 feature films in a variety of roles, and best known for his work as lead actor in films such as Thene Manasulu (1965), Kanne Manasulu (1966),  and Private Master (1967), whilst media described him as Andhra Dev Anand due to his similarities with Bollywood actor Dev Anand.  Ram Mohan worked with stalwart directors of the time such as B. N. Reddy, Adurthi Subba Rao, V. Madhusudhana Rao, K. Viswanath, and T. Krishna.

Personal life and death
Ram Mohan was born, February 4, 1939, in Giddaluru, Prakasam District, Andhra Pradesh into a Telugu speaking family of Varanasi Rama Rao, and sons. Ram Mohan is second child among eight children. Ram Mohan completed BE degree in Kurnool. Prior to films he worked as Engineering Manager with Hindustan Aeronautics Limited in Bangalore. He died in 2005 due to ill health.

Selected filmography
As actor
Ramarajyamlo Rakthapasam (1976)
Vintha Samsaram (1971)
Pasidi Manasulu (1970)
Evaru Monagadu (1968)
Thalli Prema (1968)
Sudigundalu (1968)
Lakshmi Nivasam (1968)
Sri Rama Katha (1968)
Private Master (1967)
Upayamlo Apayam (1967)
Kanne Manasulu (1966)
Rangula Ratnam (1966)
Thene Manasulu (1965)

References

External links

1939 births
Telugu people
Telugu male actors
2005 deaths
Date of death missing
Male actors in Telugu cinema
People from Prakasam district
Film producers from Andhra Pradesh
Male actors from Andhra Pradesh
Indian male film actors
Indian engineers
20th-century Indian male actors
20th-century Indian film directors